The Kent and Sussex Hospital was a district general hospital located on Mount Ephraim in Royal Tunbridge Wells, Kent, England serving the West Kent and East Sussex areas. It was managed by the Maidstone and Tunbridge Wells NHS Trust until it closed in 2011.

History

The Kent and Sussex Hospital was built on the site of a mansion called Great Culverden House, designed by Decimus Burton. The foundation stone was laid by the Duchess of York in 1932. The hospital building was designed by Cecil Burns, a local architect, and opened in 1934. The original building was surrounded by lawns on three sides, but the hospital expanded upwards and outwards over the decades. This expansion included the installation of six wartime emergency huts shortly after the hospital's completion; four of these huts were still in use as wards into the 21st century.

Closure
Nearby Pembury Hospital was rebuilt as the Tunbridge Wells Hospital in the 2000s. Services were then transferred from the Kent and Sussex Hospital, which closed on 21 September 2011.

Planning permission was granted to redevelop the hospital site for a mix of housing, offices and a school in December 2012.

See also
 Healthcare in Kent
 List of hospitals in England

References

External links
Official site

Defunct hospitals in England
Hospitals in Kent
Buildings and structures in Royal Tunbridge Wells
Hospital buildings completed in 1934
Hospitals established in 1934
Hospitals disestablished in 2011
1934 establishments in England
2011 disestablishments in England
Defunct companies based in Kent